Disney Star Asianet Network is an Indian media conglomerate company headquartered in Kochi owned by The Walt Disney Company India operated by Disney Star both divisions are wholly owned by The Walt Disney Company. Disney Star operates Asianet, Asianet HD, Asianet Plus, Asianet Middle East, Asianet Movies, Asianet Movies HD, Star Vijay, Vijay Super, Vijay Takkar, Vijay International, Star Suvarna, Suvarna Plus. 

Malayalam and Kannada news channels, Asianet News (formerly Asianet Global) and Asianet Suvarna News (formerly Asianet Suvarna), are owned by Asianet News Network (ANN), a subsidiary of Jupiter  Entertainment Ventures . Asianet Digital Network are owned by Asianet Satellite Communications divisions under (Cable TV, Broadband & Teleshopping, Consumer Electronics, OTT, Pay television & Broadcasting) is a Telecommunication Company Asianet News Network, Asianet Satellite Communications, Disney Star Asianet use that channel's "name" and" logo".

History
Asianet Communications was the first entertainment television company in Malayalam. Star India started discussions with the Asianet Communications Star India then owners of the Asianet in August, 2008. Star India eventually bought a 51% stake in Asianet Communications and formed joint venture with JEV in November, 2008. The joint venture, called "Star Jupiter", comprised all general entertainment channels of Asianet Communications (Asianet, Asianet Plus, Asianet Suvarna, Asianet Sitara, Star Vijay). Star India had reportedly paid $235 million in cash for the 51% stake and assumed net debt of approximately $20 million.

Star India increased its stake in Asianet Communications to 75% in July 2010 (for which Star India paid around $90 million in cash), and to 87%, by acquiring 12% stake for $160 million in June, 2013. The later move was by virtue of acquiring a 19% equity stake in Vijay TV from Rajeev Chandrasekhar and Asianet Communications MD K Madhavan. Following the June, 2013 investment, Asianet Communications was valued at $1.33 billion. Star India acquired 100% stake in Asianet Communications (buying the remaining 13% stake) in March, 2014.

After Disney acquired 21st Century Fox, Disney Star Asianet and all subsidiaries of Disney Star became subsidiaries of The Walt Disney Company and were reorganized under The Walt Disney Company India.

Asianet, Asianet HD, Asianet Plus, Asianet Middle East, Asianet Movies, Asianet Movies HD, Star Vijay, Star Vijay HD, Star Vijay Super, Star Vijay Super HD, Star Vijay Music, Star Suvarna, Star Suvarna HD & Star Suvarna Plus are owned by The Walt Disney Company India operated by Disney Star both divisions are subsidiary of The Walt Disney Company.

Radio
Best FM 95 is run by Asianet Star Communications. Best FM 95 has two FM radio stations in Kerala, Thrissur and Kannur. It broadcasts music in three languages (Malayalam, Tamil and Hindi). Best fm 95 was launched on January 13, 2008.

References

External links
 Official site

Disney India
Disney Star
The Walt Disney Company subsidiaries
Mass media companies of India
Television networks in India
Companies based in Thiruvananthapuram
Television stations in Thiruvananthapuram
Television channels and stations established in 1991
Television stations in Kochi
Mass media companies established in 1991
Indian companies established in 1991
1991 establishments in Kerala
Indian subsidiaries of foreign companies
Television broadcasting companies of India
Broadcasting